The 1892 United States House of Representatives elections in South Carolina were held on November 8, 1892 to select seven Representatives for two-year terms from the state of South Carolina.  Two Democratic incumbents were re-elected, four open seats were won by the Democrats and the open seat in the 7th congressional district was picked up by the Republicans.  The composition of the state delegation after the election was six Democrats and one Republican.

1st congressional district
Incumbent Democratic Congressman William H. Brawley of the 1st congressional district, in office since 1891, defeated J. William Stokes in the Democratic primary and was unopposed in the general election.

Democratic primary

General election results

|-
| 
| colspan=5 |Democratic hold
|-

2nd congressional district
Incumbent Democratic Congressman George D. Tillman of the 2nd congressional district, in office since 1883, was defeated in the Democratic primary by W. Jasper Talbert.  He was unopposed in the general election.

Democratic primary

General election results

|-
| 
| colspan=5 |Democratic hold
|-

3rd congressional district
Incumbent Democratic Congressman George Johnstone of the 3rd congressional district, in office since 1891, was defeated in the Democratic primary by Asbury Latimer.  He defeated John R. Tolbert in the general election.

Democratic primary

General election results

|-
| 
| colspan=5 |Democratic hold
|-

4th congressional district
Incumbent Democratic Congressman George W. Shell of the 4th congressional district, in office since 1891, defeated Joseph T. Johnson in the Democratic primary and Republican Joshua A.T. Ensor in the general election.

Democratic primary

General election results

|-
| 
| colspan=5 |Democratic hold
|-

5th congressional district
Incumbent Democratic Congressman John J. Hemphill of the 5th congressional district, in office since 1883, was defeated in the Democratic primary by Thomas J. Strait.  He defeated Republican challenger E. Brooks Sligh in the general election.

Democratic primary

General election results

|-
| 
| colspan=5 |Democratic hold
|-

6th congressional district special election
Incumbent Democratic Congressman Eli T. Stackhouse of the 6th congressional district, in office since 1891, died on June 14, 1892 during the Democratic primary campaign.  A special election for the remainder of the term was called to be held simultaneously with the regular election.  The South Carolina Democratic Party decided that the winner of the primary election would be their candidate for both the special and regular elections.  John L. McLaurin won the primary and defeated Republican challenger E.J. Sawyer in the general election.

Democratic primary

General election results

|-
| 
| colspan=5 |Democratic hold
|-

6th congressional district
John L. McLaurin, winner of the Democratic primary for both the special and regular election of the 6th congressional district, defeated Republican challenger E.J. Sawyer in the general election to win the term for the 53rd Congress.

General election results

|-
| 
| colspan=5 |Democratic hold
|-

7th congressional district
Incumbent Democratic Congressman William Elliott of the 7th congressional district, in office since 1891, declined to seek re-election.  Republican George W. Murray defeated Democratic challenger E.W. Moise in the general election.

Democratic primary

General election results

|-
| 
| colspan=5 |Republican gain from Democratic
|-

See also
United States House of Representatives elections, 1892
South Carolina gubernatorial election, 1892
South Carolina's congressional districts

References

"Report of the State Board of Canvassers of the Result of the General Election, Held November 8, 1892." Reports and Resolutions of the General Assembly of the State of South Carolina at the Regular Session Commencing November 22, 1892. Volume I. Columbia, SC: Charles A. Calvo, Jr., 1892, pp. 550–551.

South Carolina
1892
South Carolina